Star Trek Spaceflight Chronology is a 1980 book written and edited by Stan Goldstein and Fred Goldstein, and illustrated by Rick Sternbach. At the time of its publication it was the official history of the Star Trek universe. The first season of Star Trek: The Next Generation used references and dates that indicated that the Star Trek Spaceflight Chronology was no longer being followed, and it was eventually replaced by Star Trek Chronology as the official history of the Star Trek universe and declared apocrypha in 2002.  In 2006, Pocket Books published Voyages of Imagination, which expanded Star Trek Chronology to include the events of all of the Star Trek novels.

See also
 Timeline of Star Trek – Early Chronologies

Sources

External links

1980 books
Star Trek reference books
Pocket Books books